The hazelnut is the fruit of the hazel tree and therefore includes any of the nuts deriving from species of the genus Corylus, especially the nuts of the species Corylus avellana. They are also known as cobnuts or filberts according to species.

Hazelnuts are used in baking and desserts, confectionery to make praline, and also used in combination with chocolate for chocolate truffles and products such as chocolate bars, hazelnut cocoa spread such as Nutella, and Frangelico liqueur. Hazelnut oil, pressed from hazelnuts, is strongly flavored and used as a cooking oil. Turkey and Italy are the world's two largest producers of hazelnuts.

Description
The nut falls out of the husk when ripe, about seven to eight months after pollination. The kernel of the seed is edible and used raw or roasted or ground into a paste. The seed has a thin, dark brown skin, which is sometimes removed before cooking.

Cultivation

History 
In 1995, evidence of large-scale Mesolithic nut processing, some 8,000 years old, was found in a midden pit on the island of Colonsay in Scotland. The evidence consists of a large, shallow pit full of the remains of hundreds of thousands of burned hazelnut shells. Hazelnuts have been found on other Mesolithic sites, but rarely in such quantities or concentrated in one pit. The nuts were radiocarbon dated to 7720±110 BP, which calibrates to circa 6000 BC. Similar sites in Britain are known only at Farnham in Surrey and Cass ny Hawin on the Isle of Man.

This discovery gives an insight into communal activity and planning in the period. The nuts were harvested in a single year, and pollen analysis suggests that all of the hazel trees were cut down at the same time. 

The scale of the activity and the lack of large game on the island suggest that Colonsay may have contained a community with a largely vegetarian diet for the time they spent on the island. Originally, the pit was on a beach close to the shore and was associated with two smaller, stone-lined pits whose function remains obscure, a hearth and a second cluster of pits.

The traditional method to increase nut production is called brutting, which involves prompting more of the tree energy to go into flower bud production by snapping, but not breaking off, the tips of the new year shoots six or seven leaf groups from where they join with the trunk or branch, at the end of the growing season. The traditional term for an area of cultivated hazelnuts is a plat.

Cultivars 
The many cultivars of the hazel include 'Atababa,' 'Barcelona,' 'Butler,' 'Casina,' 'Clark,' 'Cosford,' 'Daviana,' 'Delle Langhe,' 'England,' 'Ennis,' 'Halls Giant,' 'Jemtegaard,' 'Kent Cob,' 'Lewis,' 'Tokolyi,' 'Tonda Gentile,' 'Tonda di Giffoni,' 'Tonda Romana,' 'Wanliss Pride,' and 'Willamette.'  Some of these are grown for specific qualities of the nut, including large nut size or early or late fruiting, whereas others are grown as pollinators. The majority of commercial hazelnuts are propagated from root sprouts. Some cultivars are of hybrid origin between common hazel and filbert.

In Ireland and the United Kingdom, hazelnuts are sometimes referred to as cobnuts, for which a specific cultivated variety – Kent cobnuts – is the main variety cultivated in fields known as plats, hand-picked, and eaten green. According to the BBC, a national collection of cobnut varieties exists at Roughway Farm in Kent. They are called cobnuts because cob was a word used to refer to the head or "noggin," and children had a game in which they would tie a string to a hazelnut and use it to try to hit an opponent on the head.

Harvesting 

Hazelnuts are harvested annually in mid-autumn. As autumn comes to a close, the trees drop their nuts and leaves. Most commercial growers wait for the nuts to drop rather than using equipment to shake them from the tree. The harvesting of hazelnuts is performed either by hand or by manual or mechanical raking of fallen nuts.

Four primary pieces of equipment are used in commercial harvesting: the sweeper, the harvester, the nut cart, and the forklift. The sweeper moves the nuts into the center of the rows, the harvester lifts and separates the nuts from any debris (i.e., twigs and leaves), the nut cart holds the nuts picked up by the harvester, and the forklift brings a tote to offload the nuts from the nut cart and then stacks the totes to be shipped to the processor (nut dryer).

The sweeper is a low-to-the-ground machine that makes two passes in each tree row. It has a  belt attached to the front that rotates to sweep leaves, nuts, and small twigs from left to right, depositing the material in the center of the row as it drives forward. Careful grooming during the year and patient blowing at harvest may eliminate the need for hand raking around the tree trunk, where nuts may accumulate. The sweeper prepares a single center row of nuts, narrow enough for the harvesting tractor to drive over without driving on the center row. It is best to sweep only a few rows ahead of the harvesters at any given time, to prevent the tractor that drives the harvester from crushing the nuts that may still be falling from the trees. Hazelnut orchards may be harvested up to three times during the harvest season, depending on the number of nuts in the trees and the rate of nut drop due to the weather.

The harvester is a slow-moving machine pushed by a tractor, which lifts the material off the ground and separates the nuts from the leaves, empty husks, and twigs. As the harvester drives over the rows, a rotating cylinder with hundreds of tines rakes the material onto a belt. The belt takes the material over a blower and under a powerful vacuum that sucks any lightweight soil, leaves from the nuts, and discharges them into the orchard. The remaining nuts are conveyed into a cart pulled behind the harvester. Once a tote is filled with nuts, the forklift hauls away the full totes and brings empty ones back to the harvester to maximize the harvester's time.

Two different timing strategies are used for collecting the fallen nuts. The first is to harvest early when about half of the nuts have fallen. With less material on the ground, the harvester can work faster with less chance of a breakdown. The second option is to wait for all the nuts to fall before harvesting. Although the first option is considered the better of the two, two or three passes do take more time to complete than one.

Production 

In 2020, world production of hazelnuts (in shells) was 1.1 million tonnes. The hazelnut production in Turkey accounts for 62% of the world total, followed by Italy, the United States, Azerbaijan, Chile, and Georgia. 

In 2020, the United States hazelnut crop was valued at $132 million, purchased mainly by the snack food industry. Almost all hazelnut in the United States is grown in the state of Oregon.

Ferrero SpA, the maker of Nutella and Ferrero Rocher, uses 25% of the global supply of hazelnuts. This commercial product, Nutella, came under pressure after a 2019 BBC investigation found that migrant child labor is used on many hazelnut orchards in Turkey.

Uses 
Hazelnuts are used in confections to make pralines, chocolate truffles, and hazelnut paste products. The (solid) combination of ground hazelnuts with chocolate is called gianduja. In Austria, hazelnut paste is an ingredient for making tortes, such as Viennese hazelnut torte. In Kyiv cake, hazelnut flour is used to flavor its meringue body, and crushed hazelnuts are sprinkled over its sides. Dacquoise, a French dessert cake, often contains a layer of hazelnut meringue. Hazelnuts are used in Turkish cuisine and Georgian cuisine; the snack churchkhela and sauce satsivi are used, often with walnuts. Hazelnuts are also a common constituent of muesli. The nuts may be eaten fresh or dried, having different flavors.

Nutrition 

Raw hazelnuts are 5% water, 61% fat, 17% carbohydrates, and 15% protein (table).

In a  reference amount, raw hazelnuts supply  of food energy and are a rich source (20% or more of the Daily Value, DV) of numerous essential nutrients (see table).

Hazelnuts contain particularly high amounts of protein, dietary fiber, vitamin E, iron, thiamin, phosphorus, manganese, and magnesium, all exceeding 30% DV (table). Several B vitamins have appreciable content. In lesser but still significant amounts (moderate content, 10-19% DV) are vitamin K, calcium, zinc, and potassium (table).

Hazelnuts are a rich source of dietary fat, accounting for 93% DV in a 100-gram amount. The fat components are monounsaturated fat as oleic acid (75% of total), polyunsaturated fat mainly as linoleic acid (13% of total), and saturated fat, mainly as palmitic acid and stearic acid (together, 7% of total).

See also 
 Filbertone, the principal flavor compound of hazelnuts
 Frangelico
 List of hazelnut diseases
 The Hazel-nut Child

References

External links 
 
 

Hazelnuts
Corylus
Crops originating from Europe
Edible nuts and seeds

de:Haselnuss#Nüsse
pt:Avelã